María Ignacia Allamand Lyon (born August 29, 1981) is a Chilean film and television actress.

Personal life 
Allamand was born in Santiago, Chile. She is the daughter of the former Chilean defense minister and presidential candidate Andrés Allamand Zavala. Her mother is Bárbara Lyon, best known for her work with "Fundación Alter Ego". Due to her father's work, she spent part of her teenage years living in Washington D.C., United States. Back in Chile, she studied acting at the School of Theater at the Pontificia Universidad Católica de Chile (Catholic University of Chile). Later, she would also study acting in Buenos Aires, Argentina.

In 2010, she married Chilean actor Tiago Correa but the couple separated a year later. In 2013, Allamand took part in her father's presidential campaign.

Career
In 2005, Allamand made her first appearance in a film in Alberto Fuguet's film Se arrienda alongside Luciano Cruz-Coke. She became well known in Chile for her role as Eloísa Solé in Vivir con 10, a Chilevisión serial drama "Telenovela". She is also the brand ambassador for the Chilean retail chain París.

Allamand would later appear in the Nicolás López trilogy "Qué pena tu vida" (2010), "Qué pena tu boda" (2011) and "Qué pena tu familia" (2013).

Her international film career began in 2013 with Aftershock, a Nicolás López film inspired by the 2010 earthquake in Concepción, Chile. The film was produced by Eli Roth, with whom she worked again on the 2013 horror film The Green Inferno and Knock Knock in 2015.

Filmography

Films

Television

TV series

TV shows 
 :es:Juga2 (TVN, 2013) 
 :es:Zona de Estrellas (Zona Latina, 2013) 
 Vértigo (Canal 13, 2013) 
 Más vale tarde (Mega,2014) 
 :es:El Descapotable (Via X,2014)

Advertising 
 Almacenes París – Brand ambassador

References

External links 

1981 births
Pontifical Catholic University of Chile alumni
Chilean television actresses
Chilean female models
Chilean film actresses
Chilean people of French descent
Living people
People from Santiago
20th-century Chilean actresses
21st-century Chilean actresses